Le Sueur County is a county located in the south central portion of the U.S. state of Minnesota. As of the 2020 census, the population was 28,674. Its county seat is Le Center.

Le Sueur County is part of the Minneapolis-St. Paul-Bloomington, MN-WI Metropolitan Statistical Area.

History
The Minnesota Territory legislature established several counties in 1853. This county was created on March 5 of that year. It was named for French explorer Pierre-Charles Le Sueur, who visited the area in 1700.

The settlement of Le Sueur (actually two competing settlements, Le Sueur and Le Sueur City) had sprung up on the east bank of the Minnesota River, both being platted in 1852. The legislature named the combined area as the first county seat. However, its remoteness from most of the county meant hardship for most of the area's residents since the county was covered with dense hardwood forest and existing roads were impassable when wet.

Several efforts were made to acquire a more central location. In the early 1870s, Cleveland (established in 1857, inland from the river in the SW part of the county) held a referendum to become the county seat. The referendum passed, but was challenged due to voting irregularities. In 1875 another referendum made Cleveland the county seat (1875-1876). In 1876, another referendum approved moving the seat to the newly created town of Le Sueur Center; the seat was promptly moved there. In the 1870s, businessmen from Waterville gained ownership of a quarter-section of land near the county's center, cleared the timber, and platted the city of Le Sueur Center (1876). The seat was moved there after a county referendum approved it. The county seat has remained in Le Sueur Center (renamed Le Center in 1930) since 1876.

The first railroad entered the county in 1867. This began the era of greater access and mobility. The first purpose-built courthouse in Le Sueur Center was constructed in 1896–7. It has been extensively remodeled and enlarged two times since.

Geography
The Minnesota River flows northeastward along the west border of Le Sueur County, on its way to discharge into the Mississippi. The terrain consists of low rolling hills, dotted with lakes and ponds. The soil is rich and black. The terrain slopes to the north and east, with its highest point near the midpoint of its east border, at 1,145' (349m) ASL. Le Sueur is one of seven Minnesota savanna region counties where no forest soils exist and one of 17 counties where savanna soils dominate.

Lakes
The following lakes are partially or completely within Le Sueur County:

 Borer Lake
 Bossuot Lake
 Clear Lake
 Decker Lake
 Diamond Lake
 Dietz Lake
 Dog Lake
 Dora Lake
 Eggert Lake
 Ely Lake
 Emily Lake
 Fish Lake
 German Lake
 Goldsmith Lake
 Goose Lake (Cordova Township)
 Goose Lake (Waterville Township)
 Gorman Lake
 Greenleaf Lake
 Harkridge Lake
 Horseshoe Lake (part)
 Huoy Lake
 Lake Emily
 Lake Frances
 Lake Henry
 Lake Jefferson
 Lake Mabel
 Lake Pepin
 Lake Sanborn
 Lake Tustin
 Lake Volney
 Lake Washington
 Mareks Lake
 Mary Lake
 Mud Lake (Cordova Township)
 Mud Lake (Lanesburgh Township)
 Mud Lake (Lexington Township)
 North Goldsmith Lake
 Perch Lake
 Rays Lake
 Rice Lake
 Roemhildts Lake
 Round Lake
 Sabre Lake
 Sakatah Lake (part) 
 Sanborn Lake
 Sasse Lake
 Savidge Lake
 School Lake
 Scotch Lake
 Shanghai Lake
 Sheas Lake
 Silver Lake (Cleveland Township)
 Silver Lake (Elysian Township)
 Sleepy Eye Lake
 Steele Lake
 Sunfish Lake
 Tetonka Lake (headwaters of Cannon River)
 Thomas Lake
 Tyler Lake

Protected areas
The following protected areas are within Le Sueur County:

 Bardel State Wildlife Management Area
 Chadderdon State Wildlife Management Area
 Chamberlain Woods Scientific and Natural Area
 Diamond Lake State Wildlife Management Area
 Minnesota Valley National Wildlife Refuge (part)
 Ottawa State Wildlife Management Area
 Paddy Marsh State Wildlife Management Area
 Saint Thomas State Wildlife Management Area
 Sakatah Lake State Park (part)
 Seven Mile Creek State Park (part)
 Shanghai State Wildlife Area
 Sheas Lake State Wildlife Area

Major highways

  US Highway 169
  Minnesota State Highway 13
  Minnesota State Highway 19
  Minnesota State Highway 21
  Minnesota State Highway 22
  Minnesota State Highway 60
  Minnesota State Highway 93
  Minnesota State Highway 99
 List of county roads

Adjacent counties

 Scott County - north
 Rice County - east
 Waseca County - south
 Blue Earth County - southwest
 Nicollet County - west
 Sibley County - northwest

Demographics

2000 census
As of the 2000 census, the county had 25,426 people, 9,630 households, and 6,923 families. The population density was 56.6/sqmi (21.9/km2). There were 10,858 housing units at an average density of 24.2/sqmi (9.34/km2). The county's racial makeup was 96.56% White, 0.15% Black or African American, 0.26% Native American, 0.30% Asian, 0.04% Pacific Islander, 2.02% from other races, and 0.67% from two or more races. 3.92% of the population were Hispanic or Latino of any race. 44.9% were of German, 9.0% Czech, 9.0% Norwegian and 8.2% Irish ancestry. 94.0% spoke English, 3.5% Spanish and 1.7% Czech as their first language.

There were 9,630 households, of which 34.40% had children under the age of 18 living with them, 61.40% were married couples living together, 6.80% had a female householder with no husband present, and 28.10% were non-families. 23.70% of all households were made up of individuals, and 10.90% had someone living alone who was 65 years of age or older. The average household size was 2.61 and the average family size was 3.10.

27.40% of the county's population was under age 18, 7.50% was from age 18 to 24, 27.80% was from age 25 to 44, 23.20% was from age 45 to 64, and 14.10% were age 65 or older. The median age was 37 years. For every 100 females there were 100.30 males. For every 100 females age 18 and over, there were 99.70 males.

The country's median household income was $45,933, and the median family income was $53,000. Males had a median income of $34,196 versus $24,214 for females. The county's per capita income was $20,151. About 4.80% of families and 6.90% of the population were below the poverty line, including 7.50% of those under age 18 and 10.40% of those age 65 or over.

2020 Census

Communities

Cities

 Cleveland
 Elysian (partial)
 Heidelberg
 Kasota
 Le Center (county seat)
 Le Sueur (partial)
 Kilkenny
 Mankato (partial)
 Montgomery
 New Prague (partial)
 Waterville

Unincorporated communities

 Cordova
 Greenland
 Henderson Station
 Lexington
 Marysburg (partial)
 Ottawa
 St. Henry
 St. Thomas
 Union Hill (partial)

Former communities
 Okaman

Townships

 Cleveland Township
 Cordova Township
 Derrynane Township
 Elysian Township
 Kasota Township
 Kilkenny Township
 Lanesburgh Township
 Lexington Township
 Montgomery Township
 Ottawa Township
 Sharon Township
 Tyrone Township
 Washington Township
 Waterville Township

Politics
Le Sueur County residents usually vote Republican. In 78% of national elections since 1980, the county selected the Republican Party candidate (as of 2020).

See also
 National Register of Historic Places listings in Le Sueur County, Minnesota

References

External links

 Le Sueur County government’s website

 
Minnesota counties
1853 establishments in Minnesota Territory
Populated places established in 1853